Steven Halko (born March 8, 1974) is a Canadian former professional ice hockey defenceman.

Playing career
Halko was born in Caledon, Ontario. He played college hockey and was the captain at the University of Michigan for the Michigan Wolverines. After turning professional, he played in the AHL for the Springfield Falcons, Beast of New Haven, Worcester IceCats, and Lowell Lock Monsters. He spent his entire NHL career with the Carolina Hurricanes and holds the NHL record for most games played without a goal, at 155.

, Halko is a financial advisor in North Carolina.

Career statistics

Awards and honours

References

External links

1974 births
Living people
Beast of New Haven players
Canadian ice hockey defencemen
Carolina Hurricanes players
Hartford Whalers draft picks
Ice hockey people from Ontario
Lowell Lock Monsters players
Michigan Wolverines men's ice hockey players
People from Caledon, Ontario
Springfield Falcons players
Worcester IceCats players
NCAA men's ice hockey national champions